Íñigo Domenech (born 14 February 1973) is a Mexican alpine skier. He competed in the men's super-G at the 1992 Winter Olympics.

References

1973 births
Living people
Mexican male alpine skiers
Olympic alpine skiers of Mexico
Alpine skiers at the 1992 Winter Olympics
Place of birth missing (living people)